James Carnegie, 2nd Earl of Southesk (b. before 1583–1669) was a Scottish nobleman. He inherited the Earldom of Southesk from David Carnegie, 1st Earl of Southesk.

His son, Robert Carnegie, 3rd Earl of Southesk, succeeded him.

References

Earls of Southesk
1669 deaths
Year of birth uncertain
17th-century Scottish people